Gary Zhang Xinyu (born 1989) is a Mainland Chinese-born Hong Kong politician and engineer who represented New Prospect for Hong Kong in the 2021 Hong Kong legislative election and was elected as a Legislative Council member for New Territories North.

Biography
Zhang was born in Shanghai and immigrated to Hong Kong with his family as a teenager. Prior to entering politics, he trained as a railway engineer and worked as an MTR station manager. Zhang was known as the supervisor of Prince Edward Station during the attack that took place there in August 2019. At that time, he called for an independent investigation of the incident.

Electoral history

References 

Living people
1989 births
HK LegCo Members 2022–2025